Monachoides kosovoensis is a species of mollusc in the family Hygromiidae.

References

 Bank, R. A.; Neubert, E. (2017). Checklist of the land and freshwater Gastropoda of Europe. Last update: July 16th, 2017

External links
Monachoides. Uniprot Taxonomy.

Hygromiidae
Fauna of Kosovo
Gastropods described in 1992